Take on Wall Street is a coalition of more than 20 labor unions and activist groups whose goal is to reform the financial industry, hoping to take advantage of bipartisan anger toward Wall Street. 

Formed in 2016, its members, including the AFL-CIO, American Federation of Teachers, and Communications Workers of America have as their first goal the elimination of the “carried interest loophole”, while also hoping to break up big banks, revive the 1933 Glass-Steagall Act (which was repealed in 1999 under the Clinton Administration), and implement a financial transaction tax.

References

External links
 

Wall Street
Criticism of capitalism
Organizations established in 2016
Protests in the United States
Nonviolent resistance movements
2016 establishments in the United States
Progressive organizations in the United States
Left-wing organizations in the United States